All Things in Time is an album by American R&B singer Lou Rawls, released in June 1976 on the Philadelphia International Records label. The album includes Rawls' most famous hit song, "You'll Never Find Another Love Like Mine".

Background

Coming after a career lull in the years immediately preceding, All Things in Time was Rawls' first album for PIR. At the time, he was the first artist to sign with PIR, after having already enjoyed a substantial recording career and chart success with other record labels. Recorded at Sigma Sound Studios and produced by Gamble & Huff, Bunny Sigler and Dexter Wansel, All Things in Time became an immediate success on the back of its lead single, "You'll Never Find Another Love Like Mine".

Reception

Commercial
The album was Rawls' third R&B chart-topper (the first since 1966), and reached No. 7 on the Billboard 200.  "You'll Never Find Another Love Like Mine" gave Rawls the biggest hit of his career, topping Billboard'''s R&B Songs chart and Adult Contemporary chart, and making No. 2 on the Billboard Hot 100.

CriticalAll Things in Time was highly rated by critics upon release, due to the quality and variety of its material, production standards and Rawls' vocal performances. It is often cited as the best album of Rawls' tenure with PIR. In a retrospective review for Allmusic, Jason Elias described it as "...not only one of Rawls' best albums, it's also one of the finest from Philadelphia International".

Track listing

In 2005, All Things in Time was reissued on CD by Edsel Records in the UK in a double package with Rawls' 1977 album, Unmistakably Lou''.

Personnel
Kenneth Gamble – co-producer (tracks 1–2, 4, 8)
Leon Huff – co-producer (tracks 1–2, 4, 8)
Jack Faith – producer, musical arranger (track 3) 
Bunny Sigler – producer (tracks 5–6)
Bobby Martin – producer (track 9), musical arranger (tracks 1–2, 4–5, 8–9)
Richard Rome – musical arranger (track 6)
Dexter Wansel – producer, musical arranger (track 7)
Joe Tarsia – engineer
Jim Gallagher – engineer
Carl Paroulo – engineer
Jay Mark – engineer
Frank Laffitte – photos
Ed Lee – design

Charts

Weekly charts

Year-end charts

Certifications

See also
List of number-one R&B albums of 1976 (U.S.)

References

External links
 

1976 albums
Lou Rawls albums
Albums produced by Kenneth Gamble
Albums produced by Leon Huff
Albums produced by Bobby Martin
Albums arranged by Bobby Martin
Albums recorded at Sigma Sound Studios
Philadelphia International Records albums